Yulia Evgenyevna Takshina is a Russian stage and film actress, dancer and model.

Biography 
Yulia Takshina was born on July 9, 1980, in Belgorod. At 7 years old she said that she wanted to join the Sovremennik Theatre. When she entered high school, she became interested in journalism and pursued that in Moscow State University. After spending one and a half years there, she dropped out due to being invited by Oleg Gazmanov to join a dance group called the 'Diamond Girls'.

In 2002 she joined the Boris Shchukin's Theatre Institute and under the supervision of Vladimir Poglazov got her diploma by 2006. In 2005 Yulia made her first on screen debut starring as Vika Klachkova in a television series called Ne Rodis Krasivoy (Don't Be Born Beautiful) that gained her a fanbase and partner of 6 years Grigoriy Antipenko, who was cast as the leading character in the show.

By 2007 Antipenko and Takshina were supposed to star in the Pigmalion play however, due to her pregnancy, Yulia was unable to participate and had to give her role up to Olga Lomonosova.

Currently, Takshina works in the Vakhtangov theatre in Moscow and still appears in many film and television projects.

Personal life 
Yulia is currently unmarried but does have two sons Ivan (born June 27, 2007) and Fedor (born July 3, 2009) with Grigory Antipenko.  In June 2012, after six years of relationaship, the couple broke up. They met on the set of Ne Rodis Krasivoy (Don't Be Born Beautiful) in 2005

Filmography

References 

 Yuliya Takshina on IMDb
 Featured biography
 Kinokopilka
 Такшина Юлия Евгеньевна - биография, фильмы (mega-stars.ru)

1980 births
Living people
Russian actors
Russian dancers